National Razor may refer to:
The Guillotine, an execution device named after Joseph-Ignace Guillotin 
National Razor (band),  an American punk rock band that formed in 1998 in Baltimore, Maryland.